Secondary consort, of the Wang clan (侧福晋 王氏, d. 1805), was princess consort of Yongxuan, Qianlong Emperor's 8th son. Her family belonged to Han Chinese Plain Yellow Banner. Her personal name was Yuying (，literally : Jade Flower).

Life 
It is not known neither when was lady Wang born nor when did she enter the Manor of Prince Yi as a servant. In 1768, she gave birth to Mianzhi, Yongxuan's first son. At that time, she was awarded a title of mistress. In 1769, Wang Yuying gave birth to the first daughter, later honoured as Lady of the Second Rank. In 1772, she birthed the second daughter, who would die prematurely in 1774. That same year, she birthed the third daughter, who would die prematurely in 1776. In 1775, she gave birth to the second son, Mianmao, who would die prematurely in 1777. In July 1785, her sole daughter married Barin Mongolian prince Gongsaishang'a of the Borjigin clan. Wang Yuying died in 1805 and was posthumously honoured as secondary consort.

Issue 

 Prince Yishun of the Second Rank Mianzhi, first son
 Mianmao (绵懋), second son
 Lady of the Second Rank (1769-1834)
 Married Gongsaishang'a of the Barin Borjigin clan in July 1785
 Second daughter
 Third daughter
 Fourth daughter

Titles 

 Lady Wang
 Mistress (庶福晋/诗妾) - from 1768
 Secondary consort (侧福晋) - from 1805 (awarded posthumously)

References 

Qing dynasty people
Manchu people
Qing dynasty princesses consorts
Chinese ladies-in-waiting